Paraheminodus is a genus of marine ray-finned fish belonging to the family Peristediidae, the armoured gurnards or armored searobins. These fishes are found in the western Pacific Ocean.

Taxonomy
Paraheminodus was first described as a genus in 1958 by the Japanese ichthyologist Toshiji Kamohara with Satyrichthys laticephalus, which Kamohara had described in 1952, with off Mimase in Kochi Prefecture in Japan as its type locality, designated at its type species, although the genus was described as monospecific. The genus is classified within the family Peristediidae. Within the family Peristediidae there are 2 clades, this genus is in the clade consisting of 5 genera, with the nominate genus Peristedion in the other clade. The name of the genus Paraheminodus means “near Heminodus” from which this genus differs by having well developed barbels on its chin.

Species
There are currently 4 recognized species in this genus:
 Paraheminodus kamoharai Kawai, Imamura & Nakaya, 2004
 Paraheminodus laticephalus Kamohara, 1952
 Paraheminodus longirostralis Kawai, Nakaya & Séret, 2008
 Paraheminodus murrayi Günther, 1880 (Murray's armoured gurnard)

Characteristics
Paraheminodus armoured gurnards are similar in form to Heminodus and share the band of teeth in the upper jaw with that genus but the barbels on the chin are more developed. Another difference between the two is that in Paraheminodus the rostral process is long and flattened. like a spatula while in Heminodus is short and triangular.

Distribution and habitat
Paraheminodus armoured gurnards are found in the Indo-Pacific, the most widespread species is Murray’s armoured gurnard (P. murrayi) which ranges from East Africa to New Caledonia, north to Japan and south to Australia. The other three species are found in the Western Pacific Ocean and are deepwater, demersal fishes.

References

Peristediidae